Ridgeland High School is the name of many secondary schools in the United States, among them:

Ridgeland-Hardeeville High School, in Ridgeland, South Carolina
Ridgeland High School (Mississippi), in Ridgeland, Mississippi
Ridgeland High School (Georgia), in Rossville, Georgia